Gary Gene Watson (born October 11, 1943) is an American country music singer. He is most famous for his 1975 hit "Love in the Hot Afternoon," his 1981 No. 1 hit "Fourteen Carat Mind," and his signature 1979 song "Farewell Party."  Watson's long career has included five number one hits, 21 top tens, and 48 charted singles.

Biography
Watson was born in Palestine, Texas, United States. He was raised in Paris, Texas, but in 1963 he relocated to Houston. He began his music career in the 1960s, performing in local clubs at night while working in a Houston auto body shop during the day. He recorded for only a few small, regional record labels having a regional hit "Bad Water", until 1975, when Capitol Records picked up his album Love in the Hot Afternoon and released it nationally. The title track, a mid-tempo ballad in three-quarter time, was released in June 1975, and it  reached No. 3 on the Billboard magazine Hot Country Singles chart.

Watson's national success continued throughout the late 1970s and early 1980s, as he recorded several Billboard top-40 hits, including "Where Love Begins," "Paper Rosie," "Should I Go Home (or Should I Go Crazy)," "Nothing Sure Looked Good on You," and "Farewell Party," which was released in 1979, and quickly became Watson's signature song, and the namesake of his Farewell Party Band.

In February 2012, Watson, celebrated his 50th year in the music business with the release of Best of the Best, 25 Greatest Hits. (His first single on radio was "If It Was That Easy", released in 1962). The collection of songs was re-recorded to recreate the originals as closely as possible.  The project was produced by Dirk Johnson and released on Watson's own Fourteen Carat Music label. In June 2014, Watson released an eleven track CD, My Heroes Have Always Been Country, covering hits by some of his musical heroes such as Merle Haggard, Ray Price and Lefty Frizzell.  On February 26, 2016, Watson released his 33rd studio album titled, Real.Country.Music.  The 13-track CD contained traditional country music and the first single release is "Enough For You", a song written by Kris Kristofferson. In 2018, Watson released a gospel music CD titled My Gospel Roots. The first single from the 13-track release, "Old Roman Soldier" hit No. 1 on the Cashbox and Christian Servant Country Gospel charts in June 2018.

Watson was inducted into the Texas Country Music Hall of Fame in 2002, and inducted into the inaugural class of the Houston Music Hall of Fame in August 2013. In 2018, Watson received the "Entertainer of the Year" Award from the R.O.P.E. Awards, an honor he shared with singer, Jeannie Seely. It was the first time in the history of the Awards that there was a tie in any category.

Watson was invited to join the Grand Ole Opry, by Vince Gill, on January 17, 2020.

The Farewell Party Band

The Farewell Party Band is his long-time backing band. They were named after his 1978 hit single "Farewell Party." Between 1982 and 1984, two studio albums were released credited to Gene Watson and the Farewell Party Band. The Farewell Party Band backed Watson on one of his solo albums, and they released one studio album on their own. Several notable musicians were members of the Farewell Party Band, such as Tony Booth. While many other members have played with them since the 1980s, below is a timeline of just the members during their recorded output.

Discography

References

External links
 Official Gene Watson website
 Gene Watson Fan Site - This site, which has been active since September 2004, is recognized by Gene Watson & his management team at Lytle Management in Brentwood, TN.

1943 births
American country singer-songwriters
American male singer-songwriters
Living people
People from Palestine, Texas
People from Houston
MCA Records artists
Epic Records artists
Warner Records artists
Capitol Records artists
Step One Records artists
Singer-songwriters from Texas
Country musicians from Texas